Tarol is a village located in the region of Kasauli in Himachal Pradesh, India. It comes under the Kasauli assembly & Shimla parliamentary constituency. It is located in the Solan district of the Indian state, Himachal Pradesh.

The region is essentially hilly. It is located 8 km southwest of Solan and 38 km away from the district headquarter, Kasauli.

Geography 
The total geographical area of Tarol is 85 hectares. It is a hilly rural region located within the cantonment and town of Kasauli in the Solan district of the Indian state, Himachal Pradesh. It officially comes under the Kasauli assembly & Shimla parliamentary constituency. The nearest town to Tarol in Dagshai.

Demographics 
As of 2019 statistics, Tarol has a population of 176 people in 34 houses. The total number of males is 90, and the number of females is 86. Children with age 0-6 are 14, which makes up 7.95% of the total population of the village.

According to Census reports, Tarol has 956 Females per 1000 males out of the 176 total population of the village. There are 1000 girls per 1000 boys if the population under six years is considered.

Literacy rate in Tarol 
The Literacy rate in Tarol is 85.8%, considering the population density of the region. Male literacy is 91.57%, and for females, the rate of literacy is 79.75%.

History 
Tarol is one of the lesser-known regions in Himachal Pradesh. It is located in Kasauli, which is a trendy cantonment town. Tarol is one of the smartest and emerging regions in Himachal Pradesh.

Transports 
Public bus service is available within the region of Tarol within a distance of 5 km. The railway is available in Tarol within 10+ km within distance.

References 

 Tarol (894), Kasauli, Solan, Himachal Pradesh, India. Geographic Location, Climate Change, Weather and Environment Reports / Data for Tarol (894), Social Structure, Natural Structure, Land Structure.  Geolysis Local.
 Kasauli. Kasauli, Himachal Pradesh. 
 Census of India, 1981. District Census Handbook, Kasauli 1981 CENSUS - VILLAGE DIRECTORY

Villages in Solan district